The whitefin topeshark (Hemitriakis leucoperiptera) is a houndshark of the family Triakidae, found only in the tropical waters of the Philippines between latitudes 20° N and 5° N. They inhabit the coastal areas. They can grow up to a length of 96 cm. Adolescent specimens have dark areas on their caudal fins. The reproduction of this shark is ovoviviparous.

References

 

whitefin topeshark
Fish of the Philippines
whitefin topeshark